Jordanville may refer to:

 Jordanville railway station, Melbourne, Australia
 Jordanville, New York, a community in Herkimer County 
 Jordanville, Nova Scotia, Canada